Zhujiang New Town or Zhujiang New City is a central business district in Tianhe District, Guangzhou, Guangdong, China. It is bounded by Huangpu Avenue on the north, the Pearl River on the south, Guangzhou Avenue on the west and the South China Expressway on the east.

Covering an area of 6.44 km2, it is divided by Xiancun Road into two parts. The larger eastern section contains mainly high-end residential apartments and in the centre lies the Zhujiang park. Such a layout was modelled on the Central Park in New York where the park itself provides a green oasis in the city centre and increases the value of surrounding properties.

The western portion of Zhujiang New Town was planned as the city's new CBD for the 21st century. Its core area, which the government designated as the city's new axis of development, is a continuous open plaza which extends approximately 1.5km from Huangpu Avenue to the Pearl River. The plaze incorporates underground shopping malls, vehicular tunnels and a people mover system. Flanked by skyscrapers, at its southern end it hosts the four newly built cultural venues of the city: Guangzhou Opera House, the second Children's Palace, the new Guangzhou Library and Guangdong Museum. Immediately to the north of these buildings are the supertall Twin Towers and across the river stands the Canton Tower, which is the tallest structure in Guangzhou.

While the concept of the new town was proposed back in the late 1980s, its development had stagnated for more than a decade. Local government tried encourage development by moving some of its offices to the area, including the customs office and taxation bureau. A piece of land measuring about 3 hectares was specifically reserved and sold to the U.S. Consulate in 2001. Private companies however, were reluctant to move in due to the poor traffic connection and a lack of other amenities at that time. Eventually in 2003 the government carried out a planning review of the area, when some major adjustments were made including more public facilities and transport infrastructure being incorporated. The area finally met its opportunity of rapid development as the city prepared to host the 2010 Asian Games. The adjacent Haixinsha island was chosen as the venue of the opening ceremony, as a result the area attracted large investment from the government and property developers. Today Zhujiang New Town has the largest concentration of luxurious hotels and office buildings in the city.

Economy
R&F Properties has its head office in Zhujiang New Town.

Hopson Development was previously in Zhujiang New Town.

Diplomatic missions
The Consulate General of the United States, Guangzhou is in Zhujiang New Town. Many of the 67 consulates in Guangzhou are also set up at the office buildings in the area.

Guangzhou Metro Stations

APM line

Zhujiang New Town is served by a dedicated people mover system.

Lines 3 & 5
Zhujiang New Town is also served by the Zhujiang New Town station on Lines 3 & 5.

See also 
Tianhe District

References

External links

Central business districts in China
Tianhe District